Russ Morrissey, also known as Morrus (born June 1974), is a British reporter, game designer, podcaster, author and owner of EN World. Morrissey founded the ENnie Awards in 2001, which he ran until 2018. He also founded the book publisher EN Publishing, and the tabletop gaming news website EN World, both of which he runs currently.

Career

EN World and EN Publishing
Morrissey wrote his first tabletop RPG at the age of 14 in 1984. He founded d20reviews.com in 1999, which was renamed EN World, also known as Morrus' Unofficial Tabletop RPG News in 2001, a tabletop RPG news website and community.

In 2001, Morrissey founded the publishing company EN Publishing and has gone on to publish over 300 books under the brand.

In 2014 under EN Publishing, Morrissey wrote and published the W.O.I.N. Roleplaying Game System (What's O.L.D. IS N.E.W.).

In 2014, he was a judge on the Paizo design competition RPG Superstar.

In February 2017 Morrissey announced that he would be creating the new officially licensed Judge Dredd roleplaying game. This was later crowdfunded on Kickstarter in late 2018 and successfully funded with over 2000 backers. The Judge Dredd & The Worlds of 2000 AD roleplaying game was released immediately after the Kickstarter campaign and uses the W.O.I.N. system developed by Morrissey several years earlier.

In October 2020 Morrissey's company announced the Awfully Cheerful Engine, a comic-book inspired tabletop game. In August of the same year, he announced a project codenamed Level Up, an advanced take on Dungeons & Dragons 5th Edition.

The ENnies
Morrissey founded the Gen Con EN World RPG Awards (the ENnie Awards) in 2001, which he ran until 2018. The ENnies were created as an annual fan-based award for tabletop role-playing game products, and since 2002 were hosted at Gen Con in Indianapolis, Indiana.

The Perturbed Dragon and Battle of the Bards
In 2012, Morrissey and his brother Darren Morrissey co-wrote a six-part animated cartoon series called The Perturbed Dragon. This comedy series played on the tropes and cliches of tabletop gaming, and culminated in a music competition called Battle of the Bards.

Morrus’ Unofficial Tabletop RPG Talk
In 2018 Morrissey launched a tabletop news and sketch comedy podcast called Morrus’ Unofficial Tabletop RPG Talk, which has run for over 100 episodes. The show is presented by Morrissey and his co-hosts Peter Coffey and Jessica Hancock, and features weekly guests and topics. Morrus' Unofficial Tabletop RPG Talk is currently funded through Patreon. The podcast has include guests such as Keith Baker (game designer), Sean K. Reynolds, Jason Bulmahn, Jonathan Tweet, Robert Marriner-Dodds, Owen K.C. Stephens, Dominic McDowall-Thomas, Chris Spivey, Monte Cook, and Ryan Dancey.

The Cauldron
Morrissey's science fiction novel The Siege of Concordant, set in a galaxy called The Cauldron, was released in 2020.

Bibliography
 2000-pr Editor-in-Chief, EN World
 2000-pr Publisher, EN Publishing
 2001–19 Founder, Gen Con EN World RPG Awards (“ENnies”)
 2002 Co-author, Tournaments, Fairs, and Taverns
 2002	Co-author, Four-Color to Fantasy
 2008	Author, Advanced Rules for Beginners
 2008	Co-author, War of the Burning Sky #12: The Beating of the Aquiline Heart
 2010	Author, Paragons of the Burning Sky
 2011	Author, Space Fight!
 2012	Co-writer, The Perturbed Dragon cartoon series
 2013	Co-author, Russ Morrissey’s To Slay A Dragon
 2015	Co-author, Russ Morrissey’s To Stake A Vampire
 2015	Author, Starship Construction Manual
 2016	Author, What’s OLD is NEW Starter Kit
 2016	Author, N.E.W. The Science Fiction Roleplaying Game
 2016	Author, Real Solspace: A Guide to our Stellar Neighbourhood
 2016-pr Publisher, EN5ider Magazine
 2016–20 Publisher, TRAILseeker Magazine
 2017-pr Publisher, EONS Magazine
 2017	Author, Universal Upgrades
 2017	Author, O.L.D. The Fantasy Heroic Roleplaying Game
 2017	Author, Trappist
 2017	Author, The Moons of Boria
 2017	Co-author, Xenomorphs: The Fall of Somerset Landing
 2018–present	Co-presenter, Morrus’ Unofficial Tabletop RPG Talk podcast
 2018	Co-author, Judge Dredd & The Worlds of 2000 AD
 2018	Co-author, Starship Recognition Manual
 2018	Co-author, N.O.W. The Modern Action Roleplaying Game
 2018	Co-author, Judge Dredd & The Worlds of 2000 AD Quickstart
 2018	Co-author, The Dark Decade: From Dust Till Dawn
 2018	Author, Galactic Sentience Catalog
 2018	Co-author, Spirits of Manhattan
 2018	Author, Santiago: A Myth of the Far Future 
 2019	Author, Simply6: The Fast, Universal RPG
 2020	Co-author, SolSpace: The Spartan Gambit
 2020	Co-author, Mythological Figures & Maleficent Monsters
 2020	Author, The Siege of Concordant 
 2020  Project Lead, Level Up
 2020  Author, Awfully Cheerful Engine

Media mentions
Russ Morrissey has appeared on the following podcasts, radio shows, videos, and articles.
 Keith Baker: Six Questions: Russell Morrissey
 Mud & Blood Podcast: Judge Dredd Interview With Russ Morrissey
 Shane Plays Radio Show: Full Version Of W.O.I.N. RPG Interview With Russ Morrissey
 Tabletop Babble Podcast: Morrus
 Farsight Blogger: Russell Morrissey of EN World
 Shane Plays Radio Show: EN World & The ENnies with Russ Morrissey
 Shane Plays Radio Show: D&D Gets Classier with Morrus & Peter!
 Gamers Web: The British Are Coming AGAIN: Judge Dredd and the Worlds of 2000AD Roleplaying Game Interviews and Insights
 Rand Roll: On Random Generators with Russ Morrissey of EN World
 Mildra: Interview with Russ Morissey of EN World
 Design Notes: 10 Questions plus 1! Russ Morrissey
 The Bedrock Blog: Russ Morrissey Interview: O.L.D. and N.E.W. RPGs
 RPGnet: Russell Morrissey, What Is Old Is New
 BJ Geek Nation Podcast: Russ Morrissey with What's Old Is New RPG
 The Tome Show: New Ranger and Evolution of RPGs Podcast
 The Smart Party: Judge Dredd and the Worlds of 2000AD (Interview with Russ Morrissey)
 Plot Points: Maleficent Mythological Monsters For 5E
 Shane Plays: Mythological Figures & Maleficent Monsters for 5E
 Tabletop Babble: Morrus
 RPG Publisher Spotlight: EN Publishing
 Bald And Board: 5th Edition
 Shane Plays Geek Talk: Advanced 5E RPG Sneak Preview

References

Role-playing game designers
1974 births
Living people